Padita Agu is a Nollywood actress who produced the film, My name is not Olosho and became known with film, Last Three digits, She owns a YouTube channel where she share experiences and lessons about relationship with women.

Career 
She produced the film My name is not Olosho in which she is also the lead actor starring Demola Adedoyin, Segun Arinze, Rachel Oniga directed by Theo Ukpaa. The Nollywood actress paused for a while in 2005  to study but returned to the film industry as a lead cast in Last three digit, a comic movie directed by Moses Inwang  in 2012.

Personal life 
Young Padita was raped at 15 by armed robbers and this gave her trauma which she was able to overcome afterward.

The Nollywood actress marriage crumbled after she discover there was no love and relationship in the first place. narrating her ordeals to fans, she met him at a friend's place and they got married the first day they met.

Filmography 
Egg of life
Lost conscience
My Name is not Olosho
Cold feet
Being Annabel
Champagne
Single ladies
Last three digit
Power of 1

See also 
Ini Dima-Okojie

Linda Osifo

Cynthia Shalom

References 

Living people
Nigerian YouTubers
Nigerian film actresses
Nigerian media personalities
University of Abuja alumni
21st-century Nigerian actresses
1980 births
Nigerian Internet celebrities
Igbo actresses
Nigerian female models
20th-century Nigerian actresses